NBTI (with different capitalizations) may refer to:

 Negative-bias temperature instability, a reliability issue in integrated circuits design
 Niobium-titanium, an industrially used superconducting alloy